The 2002–03 Michigan State Spartans men's basketball team represented Michigan State University in the 2002–03 NCAA Division I men's basketball season. The Spartans, led by coach Tom Izzo in his eighth year, played their home games at the Breslin Center in East Lansing, Michigan and were members of the Big Ten Conference. MSU finished the season with a record of 22–13, 10–6 to finish in a tie for third in Big Ten play. The Spartans received a bid to the NCAA tournament for the sixth consecutive year and advanced to the Elite Eight before losing to Texas.

Previous season 
The Spartans finished the 2001–02 season with an overall record of 19–12, 10–6 to finish in fourth place in the Big Ten. Michigan State received a No. 10 seed in the NCAA tournament, their fifth straight trip to the Tournament, and were eliminated in the First Round by NC State.

The Spartans lost sophomore Marcus Taylor (16.8 points and 5.3 assists per game) to the NBA draft following the season.

Season summary 
The Spartans were led by sophomores Chris Hill (13.7 points per game) and Alan Anderson (9.8 points per game). The Spartans, despite the loss of their leading scorer, Marcus Taylor, began the season ranked No. 9 in the country. After two early wins, MSU suffered losses to Villanova and Oklahoma State in the Great Alaska Shootout. They bounced back with wins over No. 22 Virginia and No. 12 Kentucky in Lexington. After winning six consecutive games, they were shocked by Toledo and fell to No. 10 Oklahoma in the All College Classic. Michigan State finished the non-conference schedule at 8–4 and ranked No. 25 in the country.

MSU began the Big Ten regular season losing four of their first six games and fell out of the rankings. The Spartans rebounded thereafter to beat No. 19 Indiana and No. 13 Illinois. A non-conference loss to No. 15 Syracuse followed a 30-point blowout loss to No. 20 Illinois. MSU finished the conference schedule with four straight wins to tie for third place at 10–6 in conference and 18–11 overall. Michigan State beat Purdue in the Big Ten tournament quarterfinals, but fell to Ohio State in the semifinals.

The Spartans received a bid to the NCAA tournament for the sixth consecutive year. MSU received a No. 7 seed in the South Region. A win over Colorado in the First Round was followed by a rout of No. 10 Florida to reach the Sweet Sixteen for the fifth time in six years. The Spartans defeated No. 17 Maryland to advance to the Elite Eight for the fourth time in five years. However, MSU fell to No. 5-ranked and No. 1-seeded Texas in the Regional Final.

Roster

Schedule and results

|-
!colspan=9 style=| Exhibition
|-

|-
!colspan=9 style=| Regular season

|-
!colspan=9 style=|Big Ten tournament

|- 
!colspan=9 style=|NCAA tournament

Rankings

*AP does not release post-NCAA tournament rankings

Awards and honors 
 Chris Hill – All Big Ten Second Team
 Alan Anderson – All Big Ten Honorable Mention (Media)

References

Michigan State Spartans men's basketball seasons
Michigan State Spartans
Michigan State Spartans men's b
Michigan State Spartans men's b
Michigan State